Loughborough railway station is a Grade II listed railway station in the town of Loughborough, Leicestershire, on the Midland Main Line,  north of London St Pancras. The station is north-east of the town centre.

History 
The original station (opened in 1840 by the Midland Counties Railway, which was shortly to join the North Midland Railway and the Birmingham and Derby Junction Railway to form the Midland Railway) was sited a little further south.

The present station was built in 1872. The ironwork was constructed by Mr. Richards of Leicester, and the stone portion by Mr. Cox of Leicester. The track was quadrupled and has retained much of its characteristically Midland Railway architecture, apart from the fact that its canopies have been cut back. The station is grade II listed.

It became known as "Loughborough Midland" when Loughborough had three stations; Loughborough Derby Road (opened 1883 on the Charnwood Forest Railway, owned by London and North Western Railway from 1923 and closed to passengers in 1931) and Loughborough Central (Great Central Railway now used by the Great Central Railway (preserved)).

In future, there is to be a Loughborough Midland High-Level in which passengers could interchange with both network rail and the heritage GCR as the line is currently undergoing a heritage regeneration project.

Facilities
The station is staffed and has a side platform layout. A third, short platform was created on the down slow line for the commencement of Ivanhoe Line passenger services in 1993.

In 2000 passenger information systems were updated and now use dot matrix display screens. In 2006 automatic ticket gates were installed on all approaches to the station in order to cut down on fare evasion, these were complemented with ticket vending machines and additional FastTicket machines. The manual Tannoy system was replaced by an automated voice on 13 July 2011. 
Other facilities include bicycle racks, paid car parking, a shop and snack bar, public telephones and toilets. Taxis and buses are available outside; however, the bus to East Midlands Airport was withdrawn in 2010. Although the local Skylink service still operates from the town centre.

Refurbishment 
Up until 2012 access to all but platform 1 was awkward for many passengers. The station had a footbridge and a barrow crossing to access platforms 2 and 3, in addition since the early 1990s the usable length of the two main platforms was four coaches due to the A60 road bridge.

Loughborough Eastern Gateway a locally led project proved to be the catalyst after many years of proposals to improve the station. The scheme got underway in March 2010.

A £7 million package of improvements was started at the station in June 2010. Platforms were extended to accommodate the longest trains which serve the station, lifts provided to access all platforms, and refurbishment of the existing ticket office, waiting rooms and glass platform canopies.
The extended platforms 1 & 2 are capable of handling 10-car trains; and the extended platform 3 can handle up to 7-car trains.
The new facilities were opened in good time for the 2012 British and Japanese Olympic squads basing themselves in the town.

Service patterns 
Rail routes run north–south through Loughborough along the route known as the Midland Main Line, going south to London; and north to Derby, Nottingham and Sheffield.

East Midlands Railway (EMR) operate the station as well as all services.

The usual Monday - Saturday service pattern is as follows:

Platform one -
Hourly East Midlands Railway service to Sheffield via Derby and Chesterfield
Hourly East Midlands Railway service to Nottingham via Beeston
Platform two -
Hourly fast East Midlands Railway service to London St Pancras International via  Leicester
Hourly semi-fast East Midlands Railway service to London St Pancras International via Leicester, Market Harborough and Kettering
Platform three -
Hourly local East Midlands Railway service to Lincoln or Grimsby Town (alternating each hour) via East Midlands Parkway, Nottingham and Newark with limited extensions to Cleethorpes
Hourly local East Midlands Railway service to Leicester via Syston

References

External links 

 Skylink bus timetable

Grade II listed buildings in Leicestershire
Grade II listed railway stations
Railway stations in Leicestershire
Former Midland Railway stations
Railway stations in Great Britain opened in 1840
Railway stations served by East Midlands Railway
DfT Category C1 stations